The Australian women's cricket team toured England between 25 June and 13 July 2009, playing one Test match, five One Day Internationals and a Twenty20 International.

Australia won the Twenty20 International, while England won the One Day International series 4–0. The Test match, which was for the Women's Ashes, was drawn; ensuring that England retained them.

Build-up
Prior to the series, both sides took part in the 2009 ICC Women's World Twenty20, which was also held in England in June. England won the tournament, in the process beating Australia by 8 wickets in the second semi-final. The semi-final defeat was Karen Rolton's final game as captain of the Australian side, having announced before the tournament she would be standing down. Jodie Fields was announced as the new captain for the tour of England, with Alex Blackwell as her deputy.

Squads

Matches

Twenty20 International

The Twenty20 International between the two sides was played as the first part of a doubleheader at Derby; with Derbyshire's match against Lancashire providing the second half of the entertainment. Australia batted first having won the toss, and recorded a "competitive" total of 151 for 3 from their allocation of 20 overs. Leah Poulton and Shelley Nitschke compiled 55 for the first wicket, a partnership that was described as "momentum-seizing", before Karen Rolton contributed an unbeaten 43 and Lauren Ebsary a 13-ball 24.

England, who had rested bowler Katherine Brunt and batsman Caroline Atkins from the side that had won the World Twenty20 tournament, found their response stifled by Australia's opening bowlers Sarah Andrews and Rene Farrell. The pair accounted for both openers while maintaining an economy rate no higher than five. Claire Taylor, Beth Morgan and Lydia Greenway all briefly threatened, before England's innings closed on 117 for 6.

Shelley Nitschke was awarded the player of the match award, having scored 32 while opening the batting and taking the wicket of Morgan in her economical four-over spell of bowling.

One Day Internationals

England began the One Day International series the strongest, defeating Australia by nine wickets in the first of two ODIs at the County Ground in Chelmsford. Led by vice-captain Nicki Shaw after Charlotte Edwards had fallen ill, England took two quick wickets after being made to field first. Katherine Brunt, returning to the side after missing the Twenty20 International, had Shelley Nitschke caught off of the first delivery of the match, before making Lisa Sthalekar edge the ball to wicket-keeper Sarah Taylor to leave Australia 4 for 2 after the first over.

England's bowlers were rotated regularly, with the introduction of Holly Colvin into the attack proving key. Colvin removed Leah Poulton with a flighted delivery lofted to long on and Ellyse Perry, who was stumped by Taylor to leave Australia 42 for 6. Lauren Ebsary and Rene Farrell helped Australia avoid their lowest-ever total in ODIs by adding 30 for the eighth wicket, before Farrell and Sarah Andrews added a national–record 36 for the final wicket to get Australia to an all out total of 133.

England, by contrast, batted more competently than the Australians, with Taylor and Caroline Atkins barely offering a chance as they moved towards the target of 134. Jodie Fields rotated her bowlers, but the Australian spin bowlers were comfortably played by England. Taylor brought up a half-century in exactly an hour, having faced 55 balls and hit 6 fours, before she was dismissed playing "a loose slog" with England still requiring 15 to win. Her namesake, Claire Taylor, helped Atkins to reach the victory target off the last ball of the 27th over.

Test match

Day 1: Australia won the toss and elected to bat first, quickly lost 5 wickets for 28 runs (Brunt took 4 of these wickets), but Jodie Fields scored 139 runs (her first century) and together with Rachael Haynes broke the record by the sixth partnership with 199 runs. Australia closed the day with 271 for 7, and Katherine Brunt took 5 for 55.
Day 2: Australia only added 38 runs and closed the Innings in 309 runs. England lost their first 4 wickets for 28 runs, and closed the day with 116 runs for 5 wickets, trail by 203 runs.
Day 3: England fell with 268 runs, and Beth Morgan scored 58 runs (her first half century). Australia scored 128 for 1, with Alex Blackwell scored 59 runs (her second half-century), and leading by 169 runs. Karen Rolton scored her run 1,000th (1st Australian, and 10th All-time)
Day 4: With England need a draw, Australia fell with 231 runs (272 ahead) on the second session. England only scored 103 runs, but survived the day and secured the draw, retaining the Ashes. Charlotte Edwards scored 53 runs unbeaten (her 8th half century).

See also
2009 Ashes series

References

External links
Australia Women tour of England 2009 from Cricinfo

2009 in women's cricket
2009–10 Australian women's cricket season
2009 in English women's cricket
England 2009
Australia 2009
June 2009 sports events in the United Kingdom
July 2009 sports events in the United Kingdom
The Women's Ashes